Ramón Cabrera (born 30 May 1938) is an Argentine long-distance runner. He competed in the marathon at the 1972 Summer Olympics.

References

1938 births
Living people
Athletes (track and field) at the 1972 Summer Olympics
Argentine male long-distance runners
Argentine male marathon runners
Olympic athletes of Argentina
Place of birth missing (living people)